Kunisch is a German surname. Notable people with the surname include:

Georg Kunisch (1893–1936), German swimmer
Helmut Kunisch (born 1936), Swiss long-distance runner
Johannes Kunisch (1937–2015), German historian
Kornelia Kunisch (born 1959), East German handball player

German-language surnames